A Woodcock is one of seven very similar wading bird species in the genus Scolopax.

Woodcock or Woodcocks may also refer to:

Military 
 HMS Woodcock (1806), a schooner of the Royal Navy
 HMS Woodcock (U90), a WWII-era Royal Navy sloop
 USS Woodcock (AM-14), a minesweeper of the US Navy
 Hawker Woodcock, a 1920s fighter of the Royal Air Force

Places 
 Woodcock, Pennsylvania, a borough in the United States
 Woodcock Township, Crawford County, Pennsylvania, United States
 Woodcocks, New Zealand, a rural locality in the Rodney District
 Woodcock, British Columbia, Canada
 Woodcock Lake, a lake in Minnesota

Other uses 
 Woodcock Airport, near Woodcock, British Columbia
 Woodcock (apple), a variety of English cider apple first described in the 17th century
 Woodcock (surname), an English surname
Mr. Woodcock, a 2007 American comedy film
 The psychological tests of the Dean–Woodcock Neuropsychological Assessment System or Woodcock–Johnson Tests of Cognitive Abilities